The 5th Armored Division ("Victory") was an armored formation of the United States Army active from 1941 to 1945 and from 1950 to 1956.

History

The 5th Armored "Victory" Division was activated on 10 October 1941, and reached the United Kingdom in February 1944.

Combat chronicle

The division landed at Utah Beach on 24 July 1944 under the command of Major General Lunsford E. Oliver, and moved into combat on 2 August, driving south through Coutances, Avranches, and Vitré, and across the Mayenne River to seize the city of Le Mans, 8 August. Turning north, the division surrounded the Germans in Normandy by advancing, through Le Mêle-sur-Sarthe liberated on 11 August, to the edge of the city of Argentan on 12 August—8 days before the Argentan-Falaise Gap was closed.

Turning Argentan over to the 90th Infantry Division, the 5th Armored advanced 80 miles to capture the Eure River Line at Dreux on 16 August. Bitter fighting was encountered in clearing the Eure-Seine corridor, the second big trap in France. The 5th passed through Paris 30 August to spearhead V Corps drive through the Compiègne Forest, across the Oise, Aisne, and Somme Rivers, and reached the Belgian border at Condé, 2 September.

The division then turned east, advancing 100 miles in 8 hours, and crossed the Meuse at Charleville-Mézières, 4 September. Racing past Sedan, it liberated Luxembourg City on the 10th and deployed along the German border. The reconnaissance squadron of the division sent a patrol across the German border on the afternoon of 11 September to be the first of the Allies to cross the enemy frontier. On 14 September, the 5th penetrated the Siegfried Line at Wallendorf, remaining until the 20th, to draw off enemy reserves from Aachen.

In October it held defensive positions in the Monschau-Hofen sector. The division entered the Hurtgen Forest area in late November and pushed the enemy back to the banks of the Roer River in very heavy fighting. On 22 December it was withdrawn to Verviers and placed in 12th Army Group reserve.

Crossing the Roer on 25 February 1945 the 5th spearheaded the XIII Corps drive to the Rhine, crossing the Rhine at Wesel, 30 March. The Division reached the banks of the Elbe at Tangermunde, 12 April—45 miles from Berlin. On 16 April, the 5th moved to Klotze to wipe out the Von Clausewitz Panzer Division and again drove to the Elbe, this time in the vicinity of Dannenberg. The division mopped up in the Ninth Army sector until VE-day.

Casualties

Total battle casualties: 3,075
Killed in action: 833
Wounded in action: 2,442
Missing in action: 41
Prisoner of war: 22

Composition 
The division was composed of the following units:

 Headquarters
 Headquarters Company
 Combat Command A
 Combat Command B
 Combat Command Reserve
 10th Tank Battalion
 34th Tank Battalion
 81st Tank Battalion
 15th Armored Infantry Battalion
 46th Armored Infantry Battalion
 47th Armored Infantry Battalion
 Headquarters and Headquarters Battery, 5th Armored Division Artillery
 47th Armored Field Artillery Battalion
 71st Armored Field Artillery Battalion
 95th Armored Field Artillery Battalion
 85th Cavalry Reconnaissance Squadron (Mechanized)
 22nd Armored Engineer Battalion
 145th Armored Signal Company
 Headquarters and Headquarters Company, 5th Armored Division Trains
 127th Armored Maintenance Battalion
 75th Armored Medical Battalion
 Military Police Platoon
 Band

Attachments

 628th Tank Destroyer Battalion (attached 2 August 1944 –  19 December 1944, 28 January 1945 – 9 May 1945)
 629th Tank Destroyer Battalion (attached 29 August 1944  – 14 December 1944)
 771st Tank Destroyer Battalion (attached 17 April 1945  – 24 April 1945)
 387th AAA Automatic Weapons Battalion (attached 1 August 1944 – 25 March 1945, 28 March 1945 – 9 May 1945)
 202d Field Artillery Battalion (attached 2 August 1944  – 25 August 1944)
The division's losses included 570 killed in action, 2,442 wounded in action, and 140 who died of wounds.

The division was inactivated on 11 October 1945, reactivated in 1950 at Fort Chaffee, AR, and inactivated for the final time in 1956.

Commanders
MG Jack W. Heard (1941–1942)
BG Sereno E. Brett (1942 – February 1943)
MG Lunsford E. Oliver (February 1943 – May 1945)

References

Further reading
 Richard S. Gardner Paths of Armor, Battery Press, 4300 Dale Ave, Nashville TN 37204, 615-298-1401

External links
 Fact Sheet of the 5th Armored Division from http://www.battleofthebulge.org
 La libération de Quierzy
 The Road to Germany: The Story of the 5th Armored Division

05
Armored Division, U.S. 05
Military units and formations established in 1941
Military units and formations disestablished in 1956
1941 establishments in the United States
1956 disestablishments in the United States